The Midwest Questar Open Aire is an American ultralight aircraft that was designed and produced by Midwest Engineering of Overland Park, Kansas. When it was available the aircraft was supplied in the form of plans for amateur construction, but the plans were withdrawn on 29 June 2000.

Design and development

The aircraft features a strut-braced high-wing, a single-seat open cockpit without a windshield, fixed conventional landing gear without wheel pants and a single engine in pusher configuration.

The Questar Open Aire is made from bolted-together aluminum tubing and wood, with its flying surfaces covered in doped aircraft fabric.

Operational history
By 1998 the company reported that 50 sets of plans had been sold and that ten aircraft were completed and flying.

Specifications (Questar Open Aire)

References

External links

Three view drawing of the Midwest Questar Open Aire

Questar Open Aire
1990s United States sport aircraft
1990s United States ultralight aircraft
Single-engined pusher aircraft
High-wing aircraft
Homebuilt aircraft